The Sleipner class was a series of corvettes ordered as part of the Royal Norwegian Navy's 1960 fleet plan.

Sleipner was built by Nylands Mekaniske Verksted, Oslo, and Æger by Aker Mekaniske Verksted, Oslo, and handed over to the Royal Norwegian Navy between 1965 and 1967. The ships were armed with an American  gun forward and a Bofors 40 mm gun aft, with a Terne III anti-submarine rocket launcher ahead of the 40 mm gun. The ships were fitted with American SQS-36 sonar.

The ships had their anti-submarine capabilities improved in 1972, when they were fitted with Mark 32 anti-submarine torpedo tubes. The ships were mainly used as training ships in the 1980s, although they did retain a wartime role as coastal escorts. They were again modernised between 1988 and 1989, with new sonar and gun fire control systems fitted.  They were decommissioned in 1993.

Ship list

See also
List of Royal Norwegian Navy ships

Citations

References
 Gardiner, Roger and Stephen Chumbley. Conway's All The World's Fighting Ships 1947–1995. Annapolis, Maryland, USA: Naval Institute Press, 1995. .
 Grove, Eric J. NATO Major Warships - Europe. London: Tri-Service Press, 1990. .
 Moore, John. Jane's Fighting Ships 1985–86. London: Jane's Yearbooks, 1985. .
 Prézelin, Bernard and A.D. Baker. The Naval Institute Guide to Combat Fleets of the World 1990/91. Annapolis, Maryland, USA, 1990. .

External links
Video: KNM Sleipner sunk as a target ship by a Hauk class patrol boat on YouTube

Corvette classes
Corvettes of the Royal Norwegian Navy